This is a list of films produced in the country of Bhutan. The films are all produced in Dzongkha language, the national language of Bhutan. Bhutanese films have gained a vast popularity amongst its citizens in the recent times due to various available multi media. Dzongkha movies contain many songs for audience attentions. 
Bhutanese movies are now shot In countries as far as America and Australia.

In the year 2010, for the first time more than 3 films (6) released in the country.

0-9
49th Day (2006)

A
Ap Bokto (2014)
Arunachal Pradesh to Thimphu (2008)
Ata Yongba (2008)

B
Bakchha (2007)
Bardo: The karma laden's State (2010)

C
Chepai Bhu (2001) by Bhutan's first trained director, Karma Tshering
Chorten Kora II (2009)
The Container (2011)
The Cup (1999)

D
The Destiny (2010)

F
Fate Cheats (2007)

G
Gasa lamai singye (1989)
Ghupadi Ko Jindagi - made by a Bhutanese, who lived in Nepal as a refugee. It is made in Nepali language. There are several Bhutanese production movies in Nepali languages.
Golden Cup: The Legacy (2006)
 GoodBye Galem

H
Hema Hema (2016)
Honeygiver Among the Dogs (2016)

L
Lengo (2005)
Lengom (2010)
Lunana: A Yak in the Classroom (2019)

M
Milarepa (2006)
Muti Thrishing: The perfect girl (2005)
My Yangsel (2008)

N
Nowi Hingkhar (2010)
Nyen dang dra (2003)
Nge Agay ("My Grandfather") Dir: Kezang Dorji Wang (2019)

O
Original Photocopy of Happiness (2011)

P
Penlop AGAY Haap (2012)
Price of Knowledge (2000)

R
The Red Phallus

S
Sacho Gamiga (2010)
sha Dha Simo  (2010)
Sharchokpa Zamin (2011)
Singlem (2011)
Sertsho Dir: Kezang Dorji Wang (2017)

T
Travellers and Magicians (2003)
Tshangpa (2002)
Tshering Meto (2004)

Y
Yeethro Lhamo

Z
Zhetha Gyab
Zhizang (2007)

External links
 Bhutanese film at the Internet Movie Database
 Bhutanese movie list

Bhutan

Films